Jean Danysz (11 March 1884 – 4 November 1914) born Jan Kazimierz Danysz, was a French physicist of Polish extraction. He was an assistant of Maria Skłodowska-Curie and notable in the development of beta spectrometry.

Danysz made considerable advances on the magnetic deflection techniques of Baeyer, Hahn and Meitner, placing the source (he used radium) in a capillary tube under a slit, with a photographic plate in the same horizontal plane. By this means the known number of lines (later understood to be conversion lines) superimposed on the beta energy spectrum of RaB + RaC went from 9 to 27 (later work by Robinson and Rutherford found 64; 16 from RaB and 48 from RaC). He finished his doctoral thesis in 1913, and by 1914 he was considered by Rutherford as a leading researcher into beta decay, but he did no further work.

Publications
J. Danysz, Le Radium 9, 1 (1912); 10, 4 (1913)

Danysz, J. Recherches expérimentales sur les β rayons de la famille du radium Ann. Chim. Phys. 30 (1913) 241–320

Family
 He was the son of biologist Jean Danysz (1860-1928).
 He was the father of physicist Marian Danysz (1909–1983).

References

1884 births
1914 deaths
20th-century French physicists
French Army soldiers
French military personnel killed in World War I